The Women's 50 metre butterfly competition of the 2022 FINA World Swimming Championships (25 m) was held on 13 and 14 December 2022.

Records
Prior to the competition, the existing world and championship records were as follows.

Results

Heats
The heats were started on 13 December at 11:59.

Semifinals
The semifinals were started on 13 December at 19:45.

Final
The final was held on 14 December at 21:14.

References

Women's 50 metre butterfly
2022 in women's swimming